Bright Star (also known as The Irene Dunne-Fred MacMurray Show) was a 30-minute, 52 episode radio comedy-drama broadcast in 1952-53 and syndicated by Ziv.

The storyline followed the misadventures of Hillsdale Morning Star editor Susan Armstrong (Irene Dunne) and her idealistic ace reporter George Harvey (Fred MacMurray) as they attempted to keep the struggling newspaper in business despite continual financial problems. 

Harry von Zell and, later, Wendell Niles were the announcers for the series.

See also
 
The Big Story
Ford Theater
Nightbeat

References

Listen to
Internet Archive: Bright Star

External links
The Definitive: Bright Star

American comedy radio programs
American radio dramas
1950s American radio programs
1952 radio programme debuts
1953 radio programme endings
Ziv Company radio programs
Syndicated radio programs